Lin Yanjun (born August 24, 1995), also known as Evan Lin, is a Taiwanese singer, rapper and actor. He debuted as a member of temporary Chinese boy group Nine Percent on April 6, 2018, through Chinese survival show Idol Producer. He is best known for his role as Su Nan Qin in the drama Crush adapted from the popular novel written by Mu Fusheng.

Early life 
Lin was born on August 24, 1995, in Haikou, Hainan and because of his parents' work, he grew up moving between Taiwan, Jiangxi, and Guangdong. He passed the Hong Kong, Macau and Taiwan student entrance examination and entered Guangdong University of Foreign Studies. His father is from Taiwan and his mother is from Jiangxi. After finishing his freshman year, he chose to suspend his school and return to Taiwan to complete his military service. He can speak Mandarin, Cantonese, Minnan, Korean and English. He has a younger sister.

At the age of 18, he was invited by JYP Entertainment to become a trainee but declined as he wanted to focus on his studies and military duties. In 2016, he signed a contract with a Taiwanese brokerage company, but as he did not get the training promised when signing the contract, he and the other members held a press conference at the door of the company to complain. After that he passed the Shanghai Banana Entertainment global trainee audition, signed a contract with Banana Entertainment and officially became a Banana Entertainment trainee.

Career

2018: Idol Producer and Nine Percent 
Lin was a member of trainee group Trainee18 under his label Shanghai Project Banana Co. On January 22, 2018, he released the trainee graduation single "Rock The Show" with Trainee18. He then participated in the idol survival show Idol Producer in January 2018. He ranked fifth in the final episode with 12,131,367 votes and debuted as a member of temporary Chinese boy group Nine Percent on April 6, 2018.

Nine Percent released their debut album 'To The Nines' on November 12, 2018, with 7 tracks. Before the group's disbandment on October 6, 2019, Nine Percent released their second album 'More Than Forever''' on September 26, 2019 where Lin Yanjun has a solo song "Like A Star". 2019–present: solo career and acting career 
Soon after his debut, Lin released his first trap single "YOU" on August 24, 2018. Then on August 29, 2018, Lin's studio was officially formed. On January 7, 2019, Lin released his first solo music EP Imperfect Love with two songs. It earned 5 million yuan within 28 seconds of release, breaking 6 sales records on QQ Music. The music video was released on February 19, 2019.

On March 25th 2019 , he won the Best New Singer Award in Hong Kong and Taiwan at the 26th ERC Chinese Top Ten Music Festival, additionally his EP “Imperfect Love” won the Most Popular EP Award in Hong Kong and Taiwan. The single has also reached No.4 on Billboard China Social Music Chart on March 3, 2019.

In Nine Percent's first debut anniversary, April 6, 2019, he released image teasers for his second personal music EP "Escape". The album was released on April 12, 2019 and is comprised two songs. Lin wrote the lyrics for the title track "Get Outta My Head" and composed the melody for "Over You". He performed both songs live at his EP launch fan-meetings in Guangzhou and Chengdu later that month.

On August 24, 2019 he released his new single "Competitor". The music video was released on August 30, 2019, on QQ Music and YouTube and became the third music video to accumulate 50 million points on the QQ Music MV Peak Chart on October 3, 2019. Prior to the release, he released two part documentary on his Weibo account, which was then shared on Sony Music Taiwan's official YouTube channel.

On April 16, 2020, he released his new single "You Are So Beautiful", with a staggering 900 million views in just mainland China, but creating a ripple across many other South East Asia countries. Then on October 13, 2020 he released a collaboration with Doja Cat of her hit song "Say So" for a Chinese version remix.

On June 13, 2020, Lin attended the filming ceremony of his first drama 一见倾心 / Fall In Love in which he stars as Xu GuangYao. He also attended the filming ceremony of his second drama 原来我很爱你 / Crush on September 14, 2020. He stars as the visually impaired Su NianQin, who is also the mysterious songwriter Yi Jin. This is his first drama as the main male lead.

On August 24, 2020, the day of his birthday, he announced his new EP will be releasing soon, and released a short teaser clip with excerpt of his new song. The song titled "Waiting for the Whole Winter" (等待整個冬天) from his EP "1995" was released on October 27. However, the song had to be taken down after few hours of release for re-producing because three lines of the lyrics were found to be highly similar to an existing song. "Waiting for the Whole Winter"'' was jointly composed by him and few of his friends before Lin debuted in 2018. Lin was not involved in the writing of the lyrics in question.

Filmography

Dramas

Television shows appearance

Discography

Albums and EPs

Singles

Soundtrack appearance

Collaborations

Awards and nominations

Endorsements and ambassadorship 
In 2018, Lin was chosen to endorse the cosmetics brands Elizabeth Arden and Panasonic Beauty as well as being the ambassador for multiple brands such as Innisfree and Korean skincare company MISSHA. Lin was also given the opportunity to be the spokesperson for both Philosophy and skincare line Martiderm.

In 2019, Lin was chosen to present the full line of YSL Beauty as well as the Korean make-up brand 3CE. He was also chosen to become the ambassador of multiple brands, including Longchamp, LANVIN, Schwepps, CLEAR and Mirinda. He also became China's first ambassador for the brand Superga.

In 2020, Lin was chosen as a brand ambassador for Clé de Peau Beauté and Descente.

References

External links 
Instagram

1995 births
Living people
People from Haikou
Idol Producer contestants
Nine Percent members
21st-century Taiwanese singers
21st-century Taiwanese male actors
C-pop singers
Taiwanese male singers
Taiwanese expatriates in China